is an athletic stadium in Toyota, Aichi, Japan.

The 5000 seat (10,052 m²) all weather sports stadium features an 8 lane 800 metres track for track and natural grass field for soccer or rugby events.

The park has numerous other sports venues:

 softball, slow-pitch and baseball fields
 archery field
 200 seat indoor gymnasium
 soccer and rugby field

See also
 List of sports venues with the name Toyota

References

External links

Football venues in Japan
Sports venues in Aichi Prefecture
Sports venues completed in 1987
1987 establishments in Japan
Toyota, Aichi